Portulaca samhaensis is a species of flowering plant in the purslane family, Portulacaceae. It is endemic to Socotra, part of Yemen. Its natural habitat is subtropical or tropical dry shrubland. It is threatened by habitat loss.

References

samhaensis
Endemic flora of Socotra
Endangered plants
Taxonomy articles created by Polbot